Luciano Mecacci (born November 27, 1946) is an Italian psychologist and author, formerly Professor at the University of Florence, best known for his contributions to history of psychology in Italy, and as an influential early disseminator of works and ideas of Lev Vygotsky in the West. He won the Viareggio Prize in 2014.

Career
After working at the Institute of Psychology of the National Research Council in Rome, and teaching as an associate and full professor at the University of Rome La Sapienza, Mecacci moved to the University of Florence in 1995, where he was also Vice Rector from 1998 to 2006. Starting in the early 1970s, he was a fellow of the Institute of General and Pedagogical Psychology in Moscow and the Institute of Psychology (USSR Academy of Sciences), and in the early 1980s he worked at the Laboratory of Experimental Psychology in Paris (CNRS). 

His main works regard the psychophysiological correlates of cognitive processes, and the history of psychology, especially Russian. His first book on Soviet psychology and neurophysiology had the preface by Aleksandr Luria; While in Moscow, Mecacci had studied neuropsychology with Luria, whom he identifies as his "fundamental figure". Mecacci edited the first unabridged Western translation of the book Thinking and Speech by Lev Vygotsky. His work as an intermediary between Russia and Western Europe has been an important influence on the reception of Vygotsky's ideas in the West during the Cold War. In the 1980's he led the periodical Storia e critica della psicologia (History and criticism of psychology). As historical studies within psychology became increasingly taught in Italy in the early 1990's, he was active in the development of the field, most notably by writing new handbooks, and is considered "one of the senior members of the history of psychology in Italy".

From the 2010s onward, he has been researching and writing literature about specific topics in Italian and Russian histories. In 2014, he won the Viareggio Prize in the non-fiction category for his book La Ghirlanda fiorentina, about the final days of the Italian philosopher Giovanni Gentile (assassinated in 1944). His 2019 book Besprizornye. Bambini randagi nella Russia sovietica (1917-1935) deals with the history of orphans in the Soviet Union. His books have been translated into English, Dutch, Portuguese, Russian, Spanish and German.

Professional affiliations
Mecacci is a member of the Academia Europaea and of the Editorial Board of the Journal of Russian and East European Psychology, and Culture and Education.

List of works
 Luciano Mecacci, Brain and history: The Relationship between Neurophysiology and Psychology in Soviet Research, preface by A. R. Luria, New York, Brunner/Mazel, 1979. 
 Luciano Mecacci, Freudian Slips: The Casualties of Psychoanalysis from the Wolf Man to Marilyn Monroe, An Rudha (Scotland), Vagabond Voices, 2009. 
 Luciano Mecacci, Dante on mind and brain, «Cortex», 138, 2021, pp. 356-364.
 Л. Мекаччи «Некоторые воспоминания о Лурии» //  Культурно-историческая психология. 2022, 18 (N° 3). C. 61-63 (Some Reminiscences of Luria).
 Luciano Mecacci, Besprizornye, Bambini randagi nella Russia sovietica (1917-1935), Milano, Adelphi, 2019.  (Russian translation in print, Izdatelstvo Ivan Limbakh, S. Peterburg).

References

1946 births
Living people
Academic staff of the University of Florence
Academic staff of the Sapienza University of Rome
Italian psychologists
Historians of psychology
21st-century Italian non-fiction writers
Viareggio Prize winners
Members of Academia Europaea